HMCS Timmins was a  of the Royal Canadian Navy that served during the battle of the Atlantic from 1942 to 1945.  She was ordered from Yarrows Ltd. in Esquimalt, British Columbia and laid down on 14 December 1940.  She was launched on 26 June 1941 and commissioned on 10 February 1942.  She was named after the community of Timmins, Ontario.

She was lightly armed with a 4-inch gun and a 2-pounder naval gun. She used depth charges for anti-submarine warfare. She was crewed by a complement of 85 sailors and 6 officers. Her unofficial badge was a smug cat clutching a U-boat in its paw.

For the first six months she performed coastal defense duties on the west coast. In October 1942 she was ordered to the east coast travelling via the Panama Canal. From November 1942 to July 1945 she escorted convoys with the Western Local Escort Force which operated from New York City to St. John's, Newfoundland. In November 1942, Timmins was assigned to escort convoy ON145. The U-boat torpedoed and sank the British merchant Empire Sailor. Timmins along with  rescued 42 survivors from the ship. She was decommissioned on 15 July 1945. In 1948 she was sold off and turned into a mercantile freighter called Guayaquil. She was reported lost on 3 August 1960.

Description
Timmins was laid down by Yarrows Ltd. on 14 December 1940 and completed 6 months and 12 days later on 26 June 1941. Total cost for construction was about $600,000 CAN. She was commissioned for active duty on 11 September 1941.

Design
Timmins was part of a second order of corvettes commissioned by the Royal Canadian Navy. After the crisis of 1940 six additional ships were ordered. She was identical to the original corvettes except that she had no minesweeping gear and her bridge wings were extended.

Like most corvettes, Timmins was installed with a Type 123A ASDIC detection system. This technology was designed in 1934 for armed trawlers and minesweepers of the Royal Navy. The system was outdated but was the best system available to the Canadian Navy at the time. Type 123A could detect the distance to underwater sounds but could not determine the depth.

Armament
Timmins was armed with one  gun forward and a 2-pounder pom-pom gun mounted aft. Twin  Vickers machine guns were mounted in the aft gun tub for air defence. Depth charges were used for anti-submarine warfare which were rolled from the stern through two ports or thrown from four launchers near the stern.

Crew
Timmins was built for a crew of 85 including 6 officers and the commanding officer.

Badge
Many Canadian naval ships of World War II adopted an unofficial coat of arms. The badge that Timmins chose was displayed on the front of the bridge and was a stylized smug cat clutching a U-boat in its paw.

Service
Timmins was launched in February 1942 and was initially assigned to the Pacific Coast Command based in Esquimalt, BC. In October 1942 she along with five other corvettes were transferred to the east coast travelling via the Panama Canal. Seaman Robert MacDonald who was travelling with the group on  reported that wireless transmission picked up significantly which was a far cry from the relative quiet on the west coast and it took a while to become accustomed to the increased chatter.

After arriving on the East Coast in November 1942, Timmins was assigned to the Western Local Escort Force (WLEF) where she escorted convoys between New York City and Halifax, Nova Scotia as far as St. John's, Newfoundland. The U-boat torpedoed and sunk the British merchant Empire Sailor. Timmins along with  rescued 42 survivors from the ship.

In July 1944 she underwent a four-month refit where her forecastle was extended. After the refit she continued operations with WLEF until the end of the war. She was decommissioned in July 1945 and anchored at Sorel, Quebec for disposal.

In 1948 she was sold as a mercantile carrier and renamed Guayaquil. She was registered under a Honduran flag of convenience. She served in this capacity until 3 August 1960 when she foundered and sank off the coast of Ecuador.

Convoy record summary

References

Notes

Citations

Works cited
Johnston, Mac. (2008). Corvettes Canada, Convoy Veterans of WWII Tell Their True Stories. Mississauga, ON:John Wiley & Sons Canada, Ltd. .
Lenton, H.T. and Colledge, J.J., eds. (1968). British and Dominion warships of World War II. New York, NY:Doubleday and Company.
Lynch, Thomas J. (1982). Canada's Flowers. Halifax, NS:Nimbus Publishing. .
MacPherson, Ken and Milner, Marc. (1993). Corvettes of the Royal Canadian Navy, 1939-1945. St. Catharines, ON:Vanwell Publishing Ltd. .

Ships of the Royal Canadian Navy
1941 ships
Flower-class corvettes of the Royal Canadian Navy
Ships built in British Columbia